Leptogium adnatum is a species of lichen in the family Collemataceae. Found in Cape Horn, the southernmost point of South America, it was formally described as a new species in 2013 by Norwegian lichenologist Per Magnus Jørgensen. The crust-like thallus of the lichen comprises densely packed, intricately folded, irregular  that in some parts form dark greyish-blue  that are firmly attached to their rock . The species epithet adnatum refers to this tight attachment. Leptogium adnatum is only known to occur on coastal rocks in the Cape Horn region. The coastal locale is unusual for a species of Leptogium, but the author speculates that the high levels of rainfall that occur in the area dilutes the salt concentration sufficiently to make the climate more amenable to the growth of the lichen.

References

adnatum
Lichen species
Lichens described in 2013
Lichens of Chile
Taxa named by Per Magnus Jørgensen